Ainoa Campo Franco (born 17 June 1996) is a Spanish footballer who plays as a midfielder for Villarreal.

Club career
Campo started her career at Rayo Simancas.

References

External links
Profile at La Liga

1996 births
Living people
Women's association football midfielders
Spanish women's footballers
People from Palencia
Sportspeople from the Province of Palencia
Footballers from Castile and León
Atlético Madrid Femenino players
Rayo Vallecano Femenino players
Madrid CFF players
Real Madrid Femenino players
Deportivo de La Coruña (women) players
Villarreal CF (women) players
Primera División (women) players
Spain women's youth international footballers